Transcription factor E4F1 is a protein that in humans is encoded by the E4F1 gene.

Function 
The zinc finger protein encoded by this gene is one of several cellular transcription factors whose DNA-binding activities are regulated through the action of adenovirus E1A. A 50-kDa amino-terminal product is generated from the full-length protein through proteolytic cleavage. The protein is differentially regulated by E1A-induced phosphorylation. The full-length gene product represses transcription from the E4 promoter in the absence of E1A, while the 50-kDa form acts as a transcriptional activator in its presence.

Interactions 
E4F1 has been shown to interact with:
 P16,
 P53, and
 RB1

References

Further reading

External links 
 

Transcription factors